The men's hammer throw event was part of the track and field athletics programme at the 1924 Summer Olympics. The competition was held on Thursday, July 10, 1924. 15 hammer throwers from ten nations competed. The maximum number of athletes per nation was 4. The event was won by Fred Tootell of the United States, the nation's sixth consecutive victory in the event. Tootell was the first of the winners to have been born in the United States; the previous winners had all been Irish-American. Fellow American Matt McGrath, the 1908 silver medalist and 1912 champion, took silver once again; he was the second man (after triple gold medalist John Flanagan) to earn three medals in the hammer throw. Malcolm Nokes earned Great Britain's first medal in the event with his bronze.

Background

This was the sixth appearance of the event, which has been held at every Summer Olympics except 1896. Two of the finalists from the 1920 Games returned: silver medalist (and 1912 finalist) Carl Johan Lind of Sweden and fifth-place finisher Matt McGrath of the United States. McGrath had finished second in 1908 and won in 1912; he had injured himself in the 1920 competition and finished fifth despite not getting to make all of his allotted throws. He had been a top thrower since 1907, overlapping John Flanagan at the end of Flanagan's prime for a titanic battle in the 1908 Games, before spending two decades sharing top honors with Patrick Ryan. Ryan had retired earlier in 1924, leaving the young (21 years old to McGrath's 47) Fred Tootell as the primary challenger to McGrath.

Brazil, France, Italy, and the Netherlands each made their debut in the event. The United States appeared for the sixth time, the only nation to have competed at each appearance of the event to that point.

Competition format

The competition continued to use the divided-final format used since 1908, with results carrying over between "rounds". Each athlete received three throws in the qualifying round. The top six men advanced to the final, where they received an additional three throws. The best result, qualifying or final, counted.

Records

These were the standing world and Olympic records (in metres) prior to the 1924 Summer Olympics.

No new world or Olympic records were set during the competition.

Schedule

Results

The best six throwers qualified for the final. The throwing order and the throwing series are not available.

References

Sources
 Official Report
 

Men's hammer throw
Hammer throw at the Olympics